Albert Sulon (3 April 1938 – 29 June 2020) was a Belgian footballer who played as a defender.

Career
Sulon played for RFC Liège, UR Namur, RES Jamboise and Tilleur FC.

He also earned 6 caps for the Belgium national team in 1965 through 1967.

His twin brother Gérard Sulon was also a footballer.

References

External links
 

1938 births
2020 deaths
Belgian footballers
Belgium international footballers
RFC Liège players
Union Royale Namur Fosses-La-Ville players
R.F.C. Tilleur players
Association football defenders
Belgian twins